FAI rent-a-jet is a German airline specializing in charter flights for the general aviation industry, based in Nuremberg and operating out of Nuremberg Airport.

History

The FAI was founded in 1986 by Siegfried Axtmann as IFA-Flugbetriebs GmbH, and in 1989 it was renamed as FAI Flight-Ambulance-Service International GmbH & Co. KG, later as FAI rent-a-jet AG after it was sold to Axtmann Holding. The sole shareholder is FAI Aviation Holding GmbH.
The headquarters of FAI Aviation Group is located at Albrecht-Dürer International Airport in Nuremberg, Germany and it is a European pioneer in the fi eld of global high-performance aviation services. FAI is also an approved provider for ICRC (International Committee of the Red Cross), WFP (World Food Programme), and other global health and aid organizations.

Business model
The FAI Aviation Group is one of the largest providers of private jet charter flights in Europe, and it specializes, according to its own statements, in VIP fl ights, freight and express courier fl ights, the transportation of intensive care patients by ambulance jet, logistics support for authorities and non-governmental organizations, as well as aircraft management consulting, leasing, and sales.

The 100% subsidiary FAI Technik GmbH acts as a service provider for aircraft maintenance.

Flotte 
FAI rent-a-jet operates Germany’s largest fleet of Bombardier Aircraft which utilised more than 14,000 hours of air time per year. FAI´s fleet of 20 jet aircraft includes five Bombardier Global Express, six Bombardier Challenger 604s, one Challenger 850 and eight Learjet 60 series. FAI runs a 14,000 m² carbon neutral FBO. 
:

References

External links

Aviapages.com charter operator profile

Airlines of Germany
Airlines established in 1987
1987 establishments in Germany